"The Lark Ascending" is a poem of 122 lines by the English poet George Meredith about the song of the skylark. Siegfried Sassoon called it matchless of its kind, "a sustained lyric which never for a moment falls short of the effect aimed at, soars up and up with the song it imitates, and unites inspired spontaneity with a demonstration of effortless technical ingenuity... one has only to read the poem a few times to become aware of its perfection".

The poem inspired the English composer Ralph Vaughan Williams to write a musical work of the same name, which is now more widely known than the poem.

Poem
Meredith's poem The Lark Ascending (1881) is a hymn or paean to the skylark and his song, written in rhyming tetrameter couplets in two long continuous sections. It first appeared in The Fortnightly Review for May 1881, at a time when (as Meredith wrote in March 1881 to Cotter Morison) he was afflicted by "the dreadful curse of Verse". It was then included in his volume Poems and Lyrics of the Joy of Earth, which first appeared in an unsatisfactory edition in June 1883, and a month later was reprinted by Macmillan at the author's expense in a second issue with corrections. Siegfried Sassoon in his commentary on the 1883 Poems ("one of the landmarks of 19th-Century poetry") observed, "to write of such a poem is to be reminded of its incomparable aloofness from the ploddings of the journeyman critic".

Summary of themes
It is a pastoral, devotional in feeling. The poem describes how "the press of hurried notes" run repeating, changing, trilling and ringing, and bring to our inner being a song of mirth and light like a fountain piercing the "shining tops of day". The joyfulness, purity and unrestrained delight of the "starry voice ascending" awakens "the best in us to him akin". The lark's song is the wine which lifts us with him in the golden cup, the valley of this world: the lark  the woods and brooks, the creatures and the human line, the dance and the marriage of life within it. The hearts of men shall feel them better, shall feel them celestially, "as long as you crave nothing save the song". The poet's voice becomes choric.

The human voice (the song proceeds) cannot express so sweetly what is inmost. Unlike the skylark, Man has not such a "song seraphically free/Of taint of personality". In the lark's song, the human "millions rejoice/For giving their one spirit voice". Yet there are those revered human lives, made substantial by trials and in loving the earth, which though themselves unsinging yet come forth as a song worthy to greet heaven. It rises in that pure song into the highest heavens and is maintained there, so that our soul rises with theirs "through self-forgetfulness divine", filling the skies, showering the world "from human stores", soaring nearer towards silence.

Consciously or unconsciously, Meredith's theme expands upon the sonnet False Poets and True by Thomas Hood (1799-1845), addressed to William Wordsworth, and is of course in debt to Shelley's Ode To a Skylark.

References

External links
 

English poems
1881 poems
Poems about birds